Ballet Robotique is a 1982 short film by Bob Rogers., and BRC Imagination Arts, previously known as Bob Rogers & Company.

Summary
Robots in General Motors automobile factories building cars to classical music (Bizet, Delibes and Tchaikovsky) performed by the Royal Philharmonic Orchestra in movements.

Accolades
1983: Academy Award for Best Live Action Short Film nomination.
1983: Columbus International Film & Video Festival winner, Bronze Plaque Award.
1983: Salerno Film Festival winner, Festival Trophy.
1983: WorldFest Houston winner, Grand Award, Best Short Subject.

References

External links

BRC Imagination Arts (formerly Bob Rogers & Company)
BobRogers.com

Ballet Robotique on Internet Archive

1982 films
1982 short films
Films about automobiles
American science fiction short films
American robot films
Films directed by Bob Rogers
Ballet films
General Motors
1980s American films